Highway 25 is a provincial highway in the Canadian province of Saskatchewan. The highway is a gravel road except for small paved sections near the eastern and western terminuses.

History
Highway 25 is part of the original Provincial Highway 3, which from Melfort traveled west to St. Louis, crossed the South Saskatchewan River via the St. Louis Bridge, and traveled concurrent with Highway 2 to Prince Albert. In 1970, Highway 3 was realigned to the newly constructed Muskoday Bridge and the bypassed segment between Birch Hills and St. Louis was renumbered to Highway 25.

References

025